Ajay Patel is Chairman of Gujarat State Co-operative Bank and Ahmedabad District Co-Operative Bank. Patel is also involved in sports associations, primarily as president of Gujarat State Chess Association and vice president of the National Rifle Association.

Personal life
Patel was born on 9 February 1962, in Ahmedabad. Born to a humble family who owned an electrical shop, Patel completed his schooling in Divan-Ballubhai School, and did his bachelor's degree in Civil engineering from Lalbhai Dalpatbhai College of Engineering. Patel is married to Devangna Patel, and they have 3 children.

Career
Patel is currently serving multiple roles in the banking and the sports industry of India.

As a Chairman of ADC Bank, he sponsored the Chess training programs in the schools of Gujarat. As a President of Gujarat State Chess Association, he launched Sardar Patel Chess College, First Ever Chess College in India, which is affiliated under Swarnim Gujarat Sports University.

Awards and honors
Patel has won recognition and appreciation awards from the National Federation of State Co-operative Banks limited (NAFSCOB), an apex body of state co-operative banks.

He has also been given the Appreciation Award in Sahakar Bharti 5th National Conference for his active role as Chairman of ADC Bank.

Ajay Patel also has been honoured with the Sahkarita Shiromani Awards for his contributions to the cooperative movement on the occasion of Kribhco's 36th Annual General Meeting.

References

External links

1962 births
Living people
Lalbhai Dalpatbhai College of Engineering alumni
Businesspeople from Ahmedabad
Indian sports executives and administrators